Consort Shu (7 July 1728 – 4 July 1777), of the Manchu Plain Yellow Banner Yehe Nara clan, was a consort of the Qianlong Emperor. She was 17 years his junior.

Life

Family background
Consort Shu's personal name was not recorded in history.

 Father: Yongshou (1702–1731), served as the Right Vice Minister of War from 1727–1729
 Paternal grandfather: Kuifang (1679–1707), held the title of a prince consort, Mingju's third son
 Paternal grandmother: Aisin Gioro Shushen (1681–1706), held the title of a third rank princess, Giyesu's eighth daughter
 Mother: Guan Sibai
 Maternal grandfather: Hantai
 One brother
 Three elder sisters
First elder sister: wife of Fuheng, of the Fuca clan
Second elder sister: Primary Princess Consort Li of the First Rank, wife of Yongkui

Yongzheng era
The future Consort Shu was born on the first day of the sixth lunar month in the sixth year of the reign of the Yongzheng Emperor, which translates to 7 July 1728 in the Gregorian calendar.

Qianlong era
On 23 March 1741, Lady Yehe Nara entered the Forbidden City and was granted the title "Noble Lady" by the Qianlong Emperor. She was elevated in December 1741 or January 1742 to "Concubine Shu", and on 20 May 1749 to "Consort Shu". On 12 June 1751, she gave birth to Yongyue, the emperor's tenth son, who would die premturely on Lady Yehe Nara's twenty-fifth birthday on 7 July 1753. Lady Yehe Nara died on 4 July 1777 and was interred in the Yu Mausoleum of the Eastern Qing tombs.

Titles
 During the reign of the Yongzheng Emperor (r. 1722–1735):
 Lady Yehe Nara (from 7 July 1728)
 During the reign of the Qianlong Emperor (r. 1735–1796):
 Noble Lady (from 23 March 1741), sixth rank consort
 Concubine Shu (from December 1741 or January 1742), fifth rank consort
 Consort Shu (from 20 May 1749), fourth rank consort

Issue
 As Consort Shu:
 Yongyue (永玥;12 June 1751 – 7 July 1753), The Qianlong Emperor's tenth son

In fiction and popular culture
 Portrayed by Akina Hong in Happy Ever After (1999)
 Portrayed by Li Chun'ai in Story of Yanxi Palace (2018)
 Portrayed by Chen Haoyu in Ruyi's Royal Love in the Palace (2018)

See also
 
 Royal and noble ranks of the Qing dynasty

Notes

References
 

1728 births
1777 deaths
Consorts of the Qianlong Emperor
Manchu people